The following list ranks wars and times of war by their duration, including both historical and ongoing battles.

Conflicts

See also 
 List of wars extended by diplomatic irregularity

Notes

References 

Lists of military conflicts
Duration